The 1948 All-Ireland Senior Hurling Championship Final was the 61st All-Ireland Final and the culmination of the 1948 All-Ireland Senior Hurling Championship, an inter-county hurling tournament for the top teams in Ireland. The match was held at Croke Park, Dublin, on 5 September 1948, between Waterford and Dublin. The Leinster champions lost to their Munster opponents on a score line of 6-7 to 4-2.

A medal won by one of the Waterford players went missing during a burglary in County Wexford in November 2022.

Match details

References

All-Ireland Senior Hurling Championship Final
All-Ireland Senior Hurling Championship Final, 1948
All-Ireland Senior Hurling Championship Final
All-Ireland Senior Hurling Championship Finals
Dublin GAA matches
Waterford GAA matches